Eriospermum graminifolium is a species of geophytic plant of the genus Eriospermum, indigenous to South Africa.

Description
This is one of several species that have slender, lanceolate leaves, including Eriospermum exile, Eriospermum bayeri and Eriospermum lanceifolium.

The leaf of Eriospermum graminifolium is leathery, slender, lanceolate and grass-like (100mm x 9mm). Usually the faintly hairy sides of the leaves are curved upwards, to the point where the leaf can seem partly rolled up. 
The irregular-shaped tuber is pinkish inside. 
The white flowers appear on a slender inflorescence in February to April.

Eriospermum graminifolium occurs in sandy or clay soils, in the south western Cape, extending as far east as the town of George.

References 

graminifolium
Renosterveld